Kue is an Indonesian bite-sized snack or dessert food. Kue is a fairly broad term in Indonesian to describe a wide variety of snacks including cakes, cookies, fritters, pies, scones, and patisserie. Kue are made from a variety of ingredients in various forms; some are steamed, fried or baked. Kue are popular snacks in Indonesia, which has the largest variety of kue. Because of the countries' historical colonial ties, Koeé (kue) is also popular in the Netherlands.

Indonesian kue demonstrate local native delicacies, Chinese and Indian influences, as well as European cake and pastry influences. For example, bakpia and kue ku are of Chinese Peranakan origin, kue putu is derived from Indian puttu, while kue bugis, klepon, nagasari, getuk, lupis and wajik are of native origin; on the other hand, lapis legit, kue cubit, kastengel, risoles and pastel are European influenced. In Java, traditional kue is categorized under jajan pasar (lit: "market buys" or "market munchies"). The colourfully decorated jajan pasar is usually given as a food gift, or served to accompany tumpeng (the main dish) during traditional Javanese ceremonies.

Etymology 
The term "kue" is derived from Hokkien: 粿 koé. It is also spelled as kuih in Malaysian, and kueh in Singapore. Kue are more often steamed than baked, and are thus very different in texture, flavour and appearance from Western cakes or puff pastries. Many kue are sweet, but some are savoury.

Indonesian kue are usually categorized according to their moisture, roughly divided under two groups, kue basah (lit: "wet kue") and kue kering (lit: "dry kue"). However, the word kue in Indonesian language is used to refer to not only these kinds of traditional snack, but also all types of cake and some types of pastries. Most kue kering are technically pastries and many Western cakes can be considered as kue basah.<ref
name="Kue Basah dan Kue Kering"></ref>

Ingredients 

Many of the traditional Indonesian kue, either sweet or savoury, are based on rice flour and coconut. Traditionally, Indonesian sweets uses gula aren or palm sugar, yet powdered sugar or common sugar are also widely used. Rice flour and tapioca probably the most commonly used flour in Indonesian kue. However, due to foreign influences, wheat flour is commonly used. For creamy flavour and texture, traditional Indonesian cakes uses coconut milk, yet today dairy product such as milk, cream, butter, cheese and margarine are also commonly used. Popular flavouring agents and spices including coconut, peanut, green pandan, ginger, cinnamon, vanilla and chocolate.

Availability 

Today, in urban Indonesian society, kue are popular snacks for brunch or afternoon break, often to accompany coffee or tea. Various kue are often offered alongside Western pastries and cakes in cafes, coffee shops, snack stalls and warung kopi.

Traditionally, kue are made prior to certain celebration or events such as lebaran or natal, often homemade in Indonesian households and communities. For example, Keraton Yogyakarta traditionally held Ngapem ceremony, where royal households communally cook kue apem (Javanese version of appam) as a part of the Tingalan Jumenengan Dalem ceremony. Additionally, kue is a lucrative business, commonly available in pasar pagi markets as jajan pasar (market buys).

In Indonesia, kue is one of the most popular street food choices. Street vendors in wheeled carts frequent residential areas or station on busy sidewalks near marketplaces or schools. Certain kue, such as kue rangi, getuk and kue putu are known to be found in residential areas, while kue ape, kue pancong, kue pukis and kue cubit tend to be sold near marketplace or schools.

In the Netherlands, various assorted selection of koeé are available in Indo toko and eetcafe snack shops.

Kue basah 

Most of traditional Indonesian kue are kue basah (wet kue). Most are moist and soft in texture, and are steamed or fried instead of baked. Kue basah is usually made with rich coconut milk, along with sugar and rice flour; as a result it can not keep for more than a day or two, especially in the hot and humid Indonesian tropical climate. In contrast, kue kering can last longer. The examples of kue basah are:
Kue agar-agar, jelly-like pudding.
Kue ape, thin wheat flour batter pancake with thicker center, colloquially called kue tetek (breast cake).
Kue apem, similar to Malay apam which ultimately derived from Indian appam. It is made of cassava tapai, coconut water, coconut sugar, rice flour, coconut milk, all mixed as a dough and steamed until fluffy and cooked. Served with grated coconut.
Kue arem-arem, rice cake snack made of compressed rice cake in the form of a cylinder wrapped inside a banana leaf, filled with diced vegetables, tempeh, oncom, minced meat or beef floss.
Kue asida, dodol-like cake made from a cooked wheat flour dough, sometimes with added butter or honey. It is popular during Ramadan.
Kue bagea, round-shaped and creamy-coloured cake made of sago. This cake has a hard consistency that can be softened in tea or water, to make it easier to chew.
Kue bahulu, tiny crusty sponge cakes which are made in distinctive shapes like buttons or goldfish, being baked in moulded pans. Bahulu is usually baked and served for festive occasions.
Kue bakcang, glutinous rice stuffed with meat (usually pork) and wrapped in bamboo leaf triangles.
Kue bakpau, baozi filled with chocolate, strawberry, cheese, mung bean, red bean, minced beef, diced chicken, or minced pork.
Kue bakpia, bean-filled Chinese pastry originally introduced by Fujianese immigrants. Today associated with Yogyakarta city.
Kue bakpia pathok, round-shaped sweet rolls (bakpia), usually stuffed with mung beans.
Kue barongko, banana cake made of mashed bananas, eggs, coconut milk, sugar and salt. Then wrapped in banana leaves and steamed.
Kue bibingka, baked rice cake made with rice flour, sugar, clarified butter, and coconut milk.
Kue bika ambon, yellow porous cake made from tapioca and sago flour, eggs, sugar and coconut milk. Bika Ambon is generally sold in pandan flavour, although it has become available in other flavors like banana, durian, cheese, and chocolate.
Kue bingka, cake made from mashed potato, flour, eggs, sugar, coconut milk, vanilla, milk and margarine, all mixed as dough and baked until golden brown and cooked. Probably related to Philippines bibingka cake.
Kue bitterballen, round-shape meat-based snack, similar to kroket.
Kue bolen, baked pastry with crust layers similar to those of croissants, made from flour with butter or margarine layers, filled with cheese and banana. Other variants use durian fillings. The cake demonstrates European pastry influences. 
Kue bolu, various sponge cakes and tarts.
Kue bolu beras, rice muffin cake.
Kue bolu gulung, swiss roll cake filled with butter cream, cheese, kaya, or fruit jam. It is also very common for swiss rolls to be sold by the slice, but some shops sell by both slice and roll.
Kue bolu kukus, steamed bun made of flour, sugar, eggs, margarine, and vanilla or chocolate flavouring.
Kue brem, fermented-tapai-based cake.
Kue bugis, steamed glutinous rice flour and tapioca colored green with pandan, filled with grated coconut and coconut sugar, wrapped inside banana leaf.
Kue bulan, circular cake shaped like the moon, white and thinner than regular mooncake. Fillings may include pork, chocolate, cheese, milk, durian, jackfruit and many other exotic fruits made into a paste. 
Kue burgo, folded rice pancake served in savoury whitish coconut milk-based soup, flavoured with fish, and sprinkled with fried shallots.
, sweet pastry made of eggs that are beaten until foamy with fine sugar. Formed using triangular plastic moulds and baked in the oven.
Kue cakwe, long golden-brown deep-fried strip of dough, commonly chopped or thinly sliced and usually eaten for breakfast with bubur ayam.
Kue cara, savory deep-fried dough with toppings of seasoned shredded tuna, a slice of chili, scallion, and celery. 
Kue carabikang, a sweet cake made of rice flour, shaped like flower-chapped and colorful.
, rice flour-based small glutinous cake, sweetened with sugar, moulded and coloured. Served with fresh grated coconut.
Kue cilok, ball-shaped dumpling made from tapioca starch.
Kue cincin, deep-fried dough pastry-based snack
Kue clorot, the sticky dough of glutinous rice flour sweetened with coconut sugar filled into the cone-shaped janur (young coconut leaf), and steamed until cooked. 
Kue combro, fritter cake made from grated cassava with round or oval shape. Combro can filled with oncom and chili.
Kue cubit, made primarily of flour, baking powder, sugar and milk. Liquid dough is poured inside a steel plate with several small round basins to form round shape. Topped with meises (chocolate granules not unlike sprinkles). Sellers use special hooked sticks to removed the cooked cakes from the steel plate. This cake is called kue "cubit" (Indonesian: pinch) because of its small bite size.
Kue cucur, pancake made of fried rice flour batter and coconut sugar.
Kue dadar gulung, grated coconut with coconut sugar wrapped inside a thin crepe made of rice flour. The dadar (crepe) is usually coloured green.
Kue dangke, traditional cheese made from buffalo or cow milk.
Kue dodol, rice flour-based small glutinous sweets, sweetened with coconut sugar, moulded and coloured. Bakers often add fruit scents and tastes such as durian.
Kue dodol susu, milk dodol cake.
Kue donat jawa, traditional doughnut snack, typically savoury, made of cassava instead of potato or flour.
Kue ganjel rel, rectangular-shaped brown cake with sesame seeds, flavored with cinnamon and palm sugar.
Kue gemblong, made of glutinous rice flour formed into a ball, deep fried and then coated with palm sugar.
Kue geplak, sweet cake made of grated coconut and sugar, often brightly colored.
Kue getuk, made of cassava flour and coconut sugar, served with sweetened grated coconut.
Kue jalangkote, fried pastry with an empanada shape and stuffed with vegetables, potatoes and eggs. Often served with spicy, sweet and sour sauce for dipping.
Kue jemput-jemput, fritter snack made from flour and then fried. It is usually round in shape and tends to vary in size.
Kue jongkong bangka, a three layers pandan rice pudding in a cup.
Kue jongkong semarang, a glutinous steamed cake of grated cassava mixed with salt and whiting water. It is filled with palm sugar inside and served with grated coconut on top. 
Kue jongkong surabaya, a layered two color (green and grey) cake made from natural food coloring those are suji and abu merang.
Kue kamir, round-shaped cake similar to apem, made from a flour, butter, and egg mixture, sometimes mixed with other ingredients such as banana or tapai.
Kue karipap, small pie consisting of curry with chicken and potatoes in a deep-fried or baked pastry shell. It can be also filled with meat mixed with vegetables (chopped carrot and beans), rice vermicelli, and sometimes egg, then deep fried in vegetable oil.
Kue keranjang, traditional cake made of glutinous rice flour and consumed during Chinese New Year.
Kue keria, fried doughnuts made with a sweet potato batter and rolled in caster sugar.
Kue klappertaart, coconut tart, specialty of Manado, North Sulawesi.
Kue klepon, balls of glutinous rice flour filled with gula jawa (red coconut sugar), boiled or steamed. The balls are rolled upon grated coconut to coat the balls. It is called "onde-onde" in Sumatra and Malay Peninsula.
Kue kochi, dumpling cake made from glutinous rice flour, and stuffed with coconut fillings and palm sugar.
Kue kompia, bread cake made with lard, onions, salt and flour. 
Kue kroket, Indonesian version of potato croquette, introduced during the Dutch colonial rule. The kroket is made of potato and minced chicken inside a crepe-like wrapper and is a popular snack item in Indonesia.
Kue ku, Chinese-origin kue of sticky rice flour with sweet filling. The same as Chinese "ang ku kueh".
Kue laddu, a sweet dough pastry made of flour, fat and sugar.
Kue laklak, traditional small pancakes made of rice flour, suji leaf extract and baking powder with grated coconut and melted palm sugar.
Kue lapis, layered colorful cake made of glutinous rice flour, coconut and sugar
Kue lapis legit, also known as Kue lapis Batavia or spekkoek (layer cake) is a rich kue consisting of thin alternating layers made of butter, eggs and sugar. Each layer is laid down and grilled separately, making the creation of a kueh lapis an extremely laborious and time-consuming process.
Kue leker, stuffed crepe. Semicircle in shape and crusty in texture, it is generally filled with a spatter of sweetened condensed chocolate milk or grated cheese. Its name was derived from the Dutch word lekker which roughly means "delicious".
Kue lemper, made of glutinous rice filled with chicken, fish or abon (meat floss). The meat filling is rolled inside the rice, in a fashion similar to an egg roll.
Kue lumpia, spring roll made of thin paper-like or crepe-like pastry skin called "lumpia wrapper" with savory or sweet fillings. It is often served as an appetizer or snack, and might be served deep fried or raw.
Kue lupis, compressed glutinous rice served with grated coconut and coconut sugar syrup.
Kue madumongso, snack made from a base of black sticky rice. 
Kue makmur, traditional cake made from butter, ghee and flour. Served during special occasion of Eid al-Fitr and identified by its white colour and round shape.
Kue mangkok Indonesian traditional cupcake, usually sweetened with palm sugar or tapai (fermented cassava).
Kue martabak, stuffed pancake or pan-fried bread. This appetizer is a spicy folded omelette pancake with bits of vegetables, sometimes mixed with green onion and minced meat, made from pan fried crepes folded and cut to squares.
Kue moci, the same recipe and derived from Japanese mochi, glutinous pounded rice flour filled with sweet peanut paste. Some variants are covered with sesame seeds.
Kue modak, a rice flour dumpling filled with sweet coconut and jaggery.
Kue nagasari or kue pisang, traditional steamed cake made from rice flour, coconut milk and sugar, filled with slices of banana.
Kue nopia, palm sugar-filled pastry smaller size than bakpia.
Kue oliebol, dumpling cake of fried bread.
Kue ombusombus, sticky rice cake with palm sugar filling, rolled in coconut flakes.
Kue onde-onde, the same as Chinese jian dui. In Sumatra, onde-onde refer to klepon.
Kue ongol-ongol, sweet cake made of sago, salt, pandan leaf and palm sugar.
Kue pai ti, thin and crispy pastry tart shell kue filled with a spicy, sweet mixture of thinly sliced vegetables and prawns.
Kue panada, fried bread cake filled with spicy tuna.
Kue pancong, rice flour and coconut milk cake.
Kue pandan, fluffy cake made of eggs, sugar, and flour, flavoured with Pandanus extract, usually colored light green.
Kue pastel, pie of crust made of thin pastry filled with meat (usually chicken) mixed with vegetables (chopped carrot and beans), rice vermicelli and sometimes egg, then deep-fried in vegetable oil. It is thought to be of Portuguese origin. Its shape is similar to Malaysian karipap (curry puff) but curry paste/powder is absent.
Kue pastel de nata, egg tart pastry dusted with cinnamon, derived from Portuguese cuisine.
Kue pau, word for 'bun'; sometimes written as bak-pau, literally meaning 'meat-bun', which is a bun with meat fillings.
Kue pinyaram, traditional cake made from white sugar or palm sugar, white rice flour or black rice, and coconut milk.
Kue pisang cokelat, savoury snack made of slices of banana with melted chocolate or chocolate syrup, wrapped inside thin crepe-like pastry skin and being deep fried.
Kue pisang goreng, battered and deep-fried banana or plantain.
Kue pisang molen, fried banana wrapped in stripe of wheat flour dough. The term molen refer to "mill" in Dutch, suggested its Dutch influence.
Kue poffertjes, Dutch-influenced batter pancakes.
Kue popiah, spring roll with Chinese-origin and Fujian-style. This dish almost equivalent to lumpia.
Kue pukis, cake made from egg mixture, granulated sugar, flour, yeast and coconut milk. The mixture is then poured into a half-moon mould and baked on fires. Pukis can be considered a modification of waffles.
Kue putu, rice flour with green pandan leaf coloring, cooked with palm sugar filling, steamed in bamboo pipes, and served with grated coconut. 
Kue putu mangkok, round-shaped, traditional steamed rice flour kue filled with palm sugar, similar to kue putu.
Kue putu mayang, idiyappam-like cake that made from starch or rice flour shaped like noodles, with a mixture of coconut milk, and served with kinca or liquid javanese sugar.
Kue rangi, coconut waffle, made from sago flour mixed with shredded coconut and served with a splash of palm sugar sauce.
Kue risoles, a mixture of minced meat, beans and carrots wrapped inside thin flour omelette, covered with bread crumbs and fried.
Kue samosa, fried or baked dumpling with a savoury fillings, such as spiced potatoes, onions or peas.
Kue semar mendem, variant of lemper, instead wrapped with banana leaf, while the glutinous rice is filled with chicken, fish or meat floss, wrapped inside thin egg omelette.
Kue serabi, pancake that is made from rice flour with coconut milk or shredded coconut as an emulsifier. 
Kue soes, a baked pastry filled with soft and moist cream.
Kue spiku, made with similar ingredients to lapis legit but with only three layers of plain and chocolate flavour layered cake.
Kue talam, literally means "tray cake", made of rice flour, coconut milk and sugar steamed in cake mould or cups. 
Kue timphan, steamed banana and glutinous rice cake wrapped in banana leaves, from Aceh.
Kue wajik, a diamond-shaped compressed sweet glutinous rice cake.
Kue wingko, a traditional Javanese pancake-like snack made from coconut.

Kue kering 

In Indonesian language kue kering (dried kue) is identical to Western cookies. Almost all kue kering are baked or fried with minimal or no water content, and thus they has longer shelf life compared to kue basah, which is easily spoiled. Some variants, especially kaasstengels, plainly demonstrate Dutch origin (kaas is Dutch word for cheese). Kue kering is often served during annual holidays and important festivities, popularly offered to visiting guests during Lebaran and Natal. Examples of kue kering are:

Kue akar kelapa
Kue bangkit, sagoo cookie
Kue bola keju
Kue cistik, kue cheese stick
Kue durian renyah
Kue gapit, tapioca waffle
Kue jahe
Kue keju suiker
Kue Kaasstengels, cheese cookie
Kue kacang sabit
Kue kering coklat
Kue keciput (kue buah rotan)
Kue kelapa
Kue kopi kelapa
Kue kurma
Kue kuping gajah
Kue lanting
Kue leker
Kue lidah kucing
Kue nastar
Kue nastar cengkeh
Kue nastar keju
Kue nastar lemon
Kue putri salju, cookies coated with white powdered sugar
Kue semprong, cone shaped pastry
Kue sagu
Kue sagu keju
Kue satu or kue koya
Kue semprit
Kue sus kering keju
Kue tambang
Kue telur gabus

Gallery

See also 
 Cucur
 Dodol
 Ketupat
 Kuih
 Lemang
 List of steamed foods
 List of Indonesian snacks
 Kue nagasari

References

External links

 
Steamed foods
Street food in Indonesia